William III (913 – 3 April 963), called Towhead from the colour of his hair, was the "Count of the Duchy of Aquitaine" from 959 and Duke of Aquitaine from 962 to his death. He was also the Count of Poitou (as William I) from 935 and Count of Auvergne from 950. The primary sources for his reign are Ademar of Chabannes, Dudo of Saint-Quentin, and William of Jumièges.

William was son of Ebalus Manzer and Emilienne. He was born in Poitiers. He claimed the Duchy of Aquitaine from his father's death, but the royal chancery did not recognise his ducal title until the year before his own death.

Shortly after the death of King Rudolph in 936, he was constrained to cede some land to Hugh the Great by Louis IV. He did it with grace, but his relationship with Hugh thenceforward deteriorated. In 950, Hugh was reconciled with Louis and granted the duchies of Burgundy and Aquitaine. He tried to conquer Aquitaine with Louis's assistance, but William defeated them. Lothair, Louis's successor, feared the power of William. In August 955 he joined Hugh to besiege Poitiers, which resisted successfully. William, however, gave battle and was routed.

After the death of Hugh, his son Hugh Capet was named duke of Aquitaine, but he never tried to take up his fief, as William reconciled with Lothair.

He was given the abbey of Saint-Hilaire-le-Grand, which remained in his house after his death. He also built a library in the palace of Poitiers.

Family background, marriage and issue
His father was duke Ebles Manzer, who already was a man in his middle years when he was born in about 913. According to the chronicle of Ademar de Chabannes, William's wife was Geirlaug (French: Gerloc, also known as Adèle), a daughter of Rollo of Normandy. The less reliable Dudo of Saint-Quentin has William rather than Ebles marrying Gerloc, perhaps about 936, in a match that may have been arranged by William I of Normandy.

With Gerloc, William had at least one child whose filiation is clearly attested:
 William, his successor in Aquitaine. He abdicated to the abbey of Saint-Cyprien in Poitiers and left the government to his son.
 Adelaide, who married Hugh Capet

See also
 Dukes of Aquitaine family tree

Notes

References

Sources

913 births
963 deaths
House of Poitiers
William 03 of Aquitaine
Counts of Poitiers
10th-century French people